Samuel Finley Breese Morse is an outdoor bronze sculpture depicting American painter and inventor Samuel Morse by Byron M. Pickett, located in Central Park in Manhattan, New York. The portrait statue measures 13' x 5'6" x 5' and sits on a Quincy granite pedestal. It was dedicated on June 10, 1871.

References

External links
 

1871 establishments in New York (state)
1871 sculptures
Bronze sculptures in Central Park
Monuments and memorials in Manhattan
Outdoor sculptures in Manhattan
Sculptures in Central Park
Sculptures of men in New York City
Statues in New York City